

December 2016

References 

 12
December 2016 events in the United States